Richard Blair or similar, may refer to:

 Richard Blair (cricketer), English cricketer
 Richard Blair (musician), founder of ChocQuibTown
 Richard Blair (patron) (born 1944), son of George Orwell
 Richard Blair-Oliphant, American composer of music for film and television
 Rick Blair, former CEO of Examiner.com

See also

 
 Richard (disambiguation)
 Blair (disambiguation)